Hocine Benmiloudi (31 January 1955 – 5 November 1981) was an Algerian football forward who played for Algeria in the 1980 African Cup of Nations.

Biography
Benmiloudi was born to an Algerian mother and a Moroccan emigrant father in El Madania, Algiers, where he began playing football. In 1971, he joined the youth team CR Belouizdad. He died at the age of 26 in 5 November 1981, during the Ligue 1 match against USM Aïn Beïda in Stade 20 Août 1955 (Algiers), from severe food poisoning.

Honours

Club
Winner of the Algerian Cup in 1978

National team
Runner-up in the 1980 African Cup of Nations in Nigeria

References

External links
Player's profile - dzfootball

1955 births
1981 deaths
Algerian footballers
Association football forwards
CR Belouizdad players
Algeria international footballers
1980 African Cup of Nations players
Footballers from Algiers
Association football players who died while playing
Sport deaths in Algeria
Deaths from food poisoning